Richmond Public Schools is a public school district located in the independent city of Richmond, Virginia. It is occasionally described locally as Richmond City Public Schools to emphasize its connection to the independent city rather than the Richmond-Petersburg region at large or the rural Richmond County, Virginia.

Administration

Superintendent 
The superintendent is Jason Kamras, who was also the 2005 United States National Teacher of the Year.

School board members 
The school district is governed by an elected school board, with one member from each of nine districts. The current Members (2022) are:

Schools

Elementary schools 
Barack Obama Elementary School (formerly J. E. B. Stuart Elementary School)
 Principal: Jennifer K. Moore
 Mascot: Stars
 Named after Confederate General J.E.B. Stuart
 Renamed after President Barack Obama
Bellevue Elementary School

 Principal: V. Tanaia Hines
 Mascot: Dragons
Broad Rock Elementary School
 Principal: Teya Green
 Mascot: Rams
Cardinal Elementary School
 Principal: Dr. Juvenal E. Abrego-Meneses
 Mascot: Cardinals
 Previously E.S.H. Greene Elementary School
Chimborazo Elementary School
 Principal: Cordell Watkins
 Mascot: Mighty Jaguars
Elizabeth D. Redd Elementary School
 Principal: Dr. Sherry Wharton-Carey
 Mascot: Redd Lions
 Named after teacher Elizabeth D. Redd 
Fairfield Court Elementary School
 Principal: Angela Wright
 Mascot: Eagles
G. H. Reid Elementary School
 Principal: Angela Delaney
 Mascot: Ravens
 Named after Principal Gurney Holland Reid
George Washington Carver Elementary School
 Principal: Tiawana Giles
 Mascot: Peanuts
 Named after inventor George Washington Carver
Ginter Park Elementary School
 Principal: Michelle Jones
 Mascot: Venal Gators
Henry L. Marsh, III Elementary School
 Principal: Kimberly Cook
 Mascot: Monarchs
 Previously George Mason Elementary School
J.B. Fisher Elementary School
 Principal: Mark Davis, II
 Mascot: Flamingos

James H. Blackwell Elementary School

 Principal: Ebony Davis
 Mascot: Bears
 Named after James H. Blackwell
J. L. Francis Elementary School
 Principal: Kecia Ryan
 Mascot: Eagles
 Named after Principal Joseph Langhorne Francis 

John B. Cary Elementary School

 Principal: Michael Powell
 Mascot: Cougars

Linwood Holton Elementary School

 Principal: Dr. Nikea Hurt
 Mascot: Lions
 Named after Governor A. Linwood Holton Jr.
Mary Munford Elementary School (formerly PBS Kids Mary Munford until 2013).
 Principal: Greg Muzik
 Mascot: Monarchs
 Named after First woman to serve on the Richmond School Board Mary Munford 

Miles Jones Elementary School

 Principal: Sonya Shaw
 Mascot: Jaguars
 Named after first African-American to chair the RPS School Board Dr. Miles Jerome Jones 

Oak Grove-Bellemeade Elementary School

 Principal: Fatima Smith
 Mascot: Teddy Bears

Overby-Sheppard Elementary School

 Principal: Kara Lancaster-Gay
 Mascot: Bumblebees
 Named after Ethel Thompson Overby and Eleanor Parker Sheppard

Southampton Elementary School

 Principal: Sheleta Crews
 Mascot: Tigers

Swansboro Elementary School

 Principal: Theron Sampson
 Mascot: Dolphins

Westover Hills Elementary School

 Principal: Alison El Koubi
 Mascot: Beavers

William Fox Elementary School

 Principal: Daniela S. Jacobs
 Mascot: Foxes

Woodville Elementary School

 Principal: Shannon M. Washington
 Mascot: Bears

Middle schools
Albert Hill Middle School
 Principal: Tashina Ivy
 Mascot: Tigers
Binford Middle School

 Principal: Melissa Rickey
 Mascot: Lions

Lucille M. Brown Middle School

 Principal: Dr. Stacy Gaines
 Mascot: Panthers

Martin Luther King, Jr. Middle School

 Principal: Inett Dabney
 Mascot: Titans

River City Middle School

 Principal: Jacquelyn Murphy-Braxton
 Mascot: Red Trails

Thomas C. Boushall Middle School

 Principal: LaTonya Waller
 Mascot: Eagles

Thomas H. Henderson Middle School

 Principal: Antoine London
 Mascot: Warriors

High schools
Armstrong High School

 East Highland Park
 Principal: Dr. Willie J. Bell Jr.
 Mascot: Wildcats

George Wythe High School

 Bon Air
 Principal:
 Mascot: Bulldogs

Huguenot High School

 Bon Air
 Principal: Robert Gilstrap
 Mascot: Falcons

Thomas Jefferson High School

 Sauer's Gardens
 Principal: Cherita H. Sears
 Mascot: Vikings 

John Marshall High School

 Chamberlyn
 Principal: Monica Murray
 Mascot: Justices

Richmond Career Education and Employment Academy

Alternative high schools

Maggie L. Walker Governor's School for Government and International Studies—regional magnet school to which RPS contributes students, located directly between the Virginia Commonwealth University and Virginia Union University campuses.
Richmond Community High School
Open High School
Franklin Military Academy - first public military school in the nation, serves grades 6-12

History
Richmond did not have public schools during much of the 19th century, only private institutions funded by user fees or charities. From 1906 until 1962, the city of Richmond segregated its public schools by race, and schools serving African American Virginians received less funding and poorer facilities, which led in part to the U.S. Supreme Court's two decisions in Brown v. Board of Education in beginning in 1954. Defiance of those decisions by the Commonwealth of Virginia led to the Massive Resistance crisis in the state which lasted more than a decade. One of the people involved in eventual peaceful desegregation of Richmond's public schools was Eleanor P. Sheppard, who began her public involvement with the Parent-Teacher Association of her children's school in the Ginter Park neighborhood. In 1954, "Mrs. Sheppard" became the first woman elected to the Richmond City Council, and she became the city's first female mayor in 1962, and served in the Virginia General Assembly for a decade. The Richmond School Board acknowledged the crisis in part by naming an elementary school to honor her and one of the school district's first principals of African American descent, Overby-Sheppard Elementary School.

The Richmond School district partly resolved the Massive Resistance crisis in its jurisdiction by eliminating racial terminology from this school district's official reports in 1962. Another important person in resolving the crisis was Virginia native and Richmond lawyer Lewis F. Powell Jr., who served as Chairman of the Richmond School Board from 1952 until 1961. Powell did not take any part in his law firm's representation of Prince Edward County, Virginia in Davis v. County School Board of Prince Edward County, which became one of the five cases decided under the caption Brown v. Board of Education in 1954. The Richmond School Board also lacked authority at the time to force integration, since beginning in 1958, the state government assumed control over attendance policies. Powell later became president of the American Bar Association and an associate justice of the Supreme Court of the United States.

Academic struggles and improvements 
In October 2009, the Richmond Times Dispatch printed an editorial entitled "Dropping In," briefly outlining a program meant to reduce the number of high school dropouts in Richmond's public school system. In this article it was revealed that Richmond's dropout rate was "hovering around 15 percent". It was also stated on the Richmond Public Schools' website that the four-year-cohort dropout rate was 14.8 percent for the 2005-2009 cohort, declined from its 16.2 percent rate for 2004–2008.

While the percentage is declining, dropout and late graduation rates are still an issue. In October 2009 in a News Release about Richmond Public Schools, it is stated that "the latest data for students in the 2005-2009 cohort indicate that nearly 69 percent (68.7) of Richmond's students graduated on time." This is an increase from the 2004-2008 cohort rate of 65.8 percent and it is well below the state average of 83.2 percent.

Dropout Prevention Initiative 
While high dropout rates in the school system are a problem, positive action is being taken, as of 2009. On October 21, 2009, the superintendent of Richmond City Public Schools, Yvonne W. Brandon, unveiled a plan called "Dropout Prevention Initiative" (DPI). The objective of this program is to continue to decrease the school system's dropout rate.

There are a few objectives to the DPI. The first is to find high school dropouts and convince them to return to high school to graduate through mentoring programs, Individual Learning Plans (ILP), and partnerships with others in the community. These "others" include higher education institutions, elected officials, as well faith-based and community-based organizations. One of the most appealing aspects of the DPI is that it requires no additional funding and is solely a redistribution of resources.

There is a district-wide mentoring program as a part of DPI that encourages Richmond Public Schools employees and students to serve as mentors once the recovered students return to school. There are also mentors provided by the higher educational institutions and the faith- and community-based organizations with which the DPI has partnerships.

A unique aspect of this program is that recovery specialists within the DPI literally walk door-to-door to the homes of students who have dropped out to talk with them about and encourage the possibility of returning to school. Students returning to school are assisted by the DPI Intake Counselors, who work with recovered students to help the student re-adjust to being in school and receive an ILP. The ILP is, as stated by the Richmond Public Schools website, "an online educational plan for students that helps pair students' career goals with academic and career and technical courses needed to accomplish their future interests".

The program also recognizes at-risk students and works on preventing student dropouts, rather than only trying to reverse it. Richmond Public Schools have implemented "Extensive Mandatory Professional Development" for staff on how to effectively identify and help at-risk students. There is also a new "Get In – Stay in" media campaign on the radio and television to help encourage attendance among students.

Trivia 

Two of Richmond's public school facilities are physically located slightly outside the corporate limits of the independent city in the East End. They are Armstrong High School, located in the former Kennedy High School complex, and Fairfield Court Elementary School. Both are located in a small portion of Henrico County adjacent to Interstate 64 which became isolated geographically from the rest of the county when the Interstate highway was built in the 1960s.

References

External links

Further reading
 

School divisions in Virginia
Education in Richmond, Virginia